Sevese Oipi Morea  (died August 1982) was a Papua New Guinean radio broadcaster, businessman and politician. He served as a member of the National Parliament from 1977 to 1982, and as Speaker from 1980 until 1982.

Biography
Morea worked as a radio broadcaster for ten years, having been trained by the Australian Broadcasting Corporation, taking over several role previously carried out by Australians. He subsequently became a businessman in Port Moresby.

He contested the Central Regional constituency in the 1968 elections, but finished fifth in a field of six candidates. In the 1972 elections he contested the Moresby Coastal Open seat, finishing second to Gavera Rea.

He ran again in the Moresby South Open constituency in 1977 as a Papua Besena candidate and was elected to the National Parliament. In February 1979 he was elected Lord Mayor of Port Moresby. However, he left office in July the same year after losing a vote of no confidence. In 1980 we was elected Speaker after the resignation of Kingsford Dibela. He was subsequently made a Companion of the Order of St Michael and St George in the 1981 New Year Honours.

However, he lost his seat in the 1982 elections. Following the elections, he submitted a petition against the result. However, he died of heart attack the following day aged 38, and was given a state funeral on 25 August. Two schools in the Gabatu area of Port Moresby were named after him.

References

Papua New Guinean radio personalities
20th-century Papua New Guinean businesspeople
Members of the National Parliament of Papua New Guinea
Companions of the Order of St Michael and St George
Speakers of the National Parliament of Papua New Guinea
1982 deaths